Michele Thoren Bond (born 1953) is a retired U.S. diplomat and former Assistant Secretary of State for Consular Affairs at the U.S. Department of State.

Early life and education
Ambassador Bond grew up in Washington, D.C. She earned a bachelor's degree from Wellesley College, and master's degrees from Georgetown University and the National War College.

Career
Ambassador Bond joined the U.S. Foreign Service in 1977. As a Foreign Service Officer, she has served in Guatemala City, Belgrade, Stockholm, Prague, Moscow, and Amsterdam. She also served as U.S. ambassador to Lesotho from October 28, 2010 to December 4, 2012 under the Obama administration. In April 2014, she became Acting Assistant Secretary for Consular Affairs. In September 2014, President Barack Obama nominated Ambassador Bond to become Assistant Secretary, and she was confirmed by the U.S. Senate in August 2015. https://2009-2017.state.gov/r/pa/ei/biog/231694.htm

Personal life
Ambassador Bond is married to Clifford G. Bond, a retired Foreign Service Officer and former U.S. ambassador to Bosnia-Herzegovina. They have four children.

References

External links

https://2009-2017.state.gov/r/pa/ei/biog/231694.htm

1952 births
Living people
Ambassadors of the United States to Lesotho
American women ambassadors
Georgetown University alumni
United States Assistant Secretaries of State
Wellesley College alumni
21st-century American diplomats
United States Foreign Service personnel
National War College alumni
21st-century American women